Nahar Singh Mahal is located at Ballabhgarh in Faridabad district of Haryana. This fort was built by the forefathers of Raja Nahar Singh around 1739 AD, and after whom Ballabgarh was named, the construction however continued in parts till about 1850. The fort is also known as Raja Nahar Singh Palace.

Architecture
The elaborate cupolas and minarets of this double-storeyed sandstone structure are fashioned around a vast central courtyard. The palace has six tastefully decorated guest rooms, replete with royal ambiance. The fort was decorated with minars on its four corners of which only two can be seen now due to age and neglect. The palace holds a Darbar-e-aam (Hall of Public Audience) and a Rang Mahal decorated with a beautiful Chhatri.

Restoration

Government of Haryana entrusted its restoration to the well-known specialists Francis Wacziarg and Aman Nath. Aman Nath, a founding member of INTACH, and his French business partner Francis Wacziarg, are conservationists and the founders of Neemrana Hotels.

Current status

Heritage hotel 

This palace is now a heritage property managed by Haryana Tourism. It has been renovated and converted into a motel-cum-restaurant. The palace has been renewed into an outstanding specimen of architectural design with help of team of experts.

Kartik Cultural Festival

Kartik Cultural Festival, the main annual fair held in the month of November since 1996, is celebrated at Nahar Singh Mahal. It is held by the Haryana Tourism, during the bright and auspicious autumn month of Kartik as per Vikram Samvat calendar.

External links
India Tours & Travels Information Portal

See also 
 Asigarh Fort at Hansi
 Chhachhrauli Fort
 Firoz Shah Fort at Hisar
 Loharu Fort
 Madhogarh Fort, Haryana
 Meham Fort
 Haryana Tourism
 List of Monuments of National Importance in Haryana
 List of State Protected Monuments in Haryana
 List of Indus Valley Civilization sites in Haryana
 List of National Parks & Wildlife Sanctuaries of Haryana, India

References 

Buildings and structures completed in 1739
Forts in Haryana
Faridabad
Palaces in Haryana
Faridabad district
Tourist attractions in Haryana
Heritage hotels in India
1739 establishments in Asia